"Hard Hearted Hannah, the Vamp of Savannah" is a popular song with words by Jack Yellen, Bob Bigelow, and Charles Bates, and music by Milton Ager. The song was published in June 1924 by Ager, Yellen & Bornstein, Inc., New York.
Hard Hearted Hannah tells in humorous fashion the story of a sadistic "vamp" or femme fatale from Savannah, Georgia.

Popularized by vocalist Margaret Young, it also had early recordings by vocalists Lucille Hegamin and Dolly Kay, Vernon Dalhart in 1924, Herb Wiedoeft's band (1924) and by Paul Whiteman and His Orchestra.  A quarter century later Peggy Lee revived "Hannah" very successfully for Capitol Records, and the Ray Charles Singers made a hit version for Decca.

The song has been recorded numerous times by such performers as Patti Austin, Belle Baker, Jim Croce, Bobby Darin, Cliff "Ukulele Ike" Edwards, Ella Fitzgerald, Sue Keller, Stacey Kent, Julie London, Turk Murphy, The Nitty Gritty Dirt Band, Nancy Sinatra, Kay Starr, Pat Suzuki, The Temperance Seven, Toni Tennille, Mary Testa, Sophie Tucker, Margaret Whiting and Sun Ra.

Memorable television or film performances of the song include those by Carol Burnett, Peggy Lee, Dorothy Loudon, Ella Fitzgerald (on Pete Kelly's Blues), and Beatrice Arthur on Maude and The Golden Girls. The song was performed by vampire Bill Compton (played by Stephen Moyer) in the sixth episode of the second season of the HBO show True Blood, also called Hard-Hearted Hannah; Dolly Kay's recording of the song plays over the final credits.

In season 1 of American Idol, contestant Nikki McKibbin sang this song in the finals where she ended up in the Bottom 3.

References

See also
List of 1920s jazz standards

1924 songs
Songs written by Jack Yellen
Songs with music by Milton Ager
1920s jazz standards
Jim Croce songs
Belle Baker songs
Ray Charles songs